Pee Mak is a 2013 Thai supernatural romantic comedy-horror film directed by Banjong Pisanthanakun. The story is an adaptation of the Mae Nak Phra Khanong legend of Thai folklore. It was released on 28 March 2013. The film stars Mario Maurer as Mak and Davika Hoorne as Nak, and Pongsathorn Jongwilas, Nattapong Chartpong, Auttarut Kongrasri and Kantapat Permpoonpatcharasook. The film was a major commercial success upon its release and became Thailand's highest grossing-film of all time.

Plot
The story is set in mid-19th century Siam, during the era of King Mongkut and at the height of the Rattanakosin Dynasty, when Siam was plagued with wars with its neighboring kingdoms. Mak (Mario Maurer) was drafted to serve in a war, forcing him to leave behind his pregnant wife Nak (Davika Hoorne) at the town of Phra Khanong, not far from Central Bangkok. He was wounded during a battle and sent to a medical camp, where he met fellow soldiers Ter, Puak, Shin and Aey, who later became his best friends after he had saved them from certain death.

Meanwhile, in Phra Khanong, Nak struggled alone painfully to give birth to the baby; she calls out for help, but she is too weak to be heard. Shortly after, rumors started circulating the village that Nak had died in labor and was now a ghost of a very powerful form haunting the house. The villagers in the neighborhood then heard her singing lullabies to her baby, terrifying them and forcing them to cower in fear.

When Mak and his friends arrive back in Phra Khanong in the evening, they find the town completely silent. The five soon arrive at Mak and Nak's house during the night, and Mak introduces Nak to them. As it is now too dark to continue traveling, Mak's friends decide to stay.

The following day, the men visit the village market but are shunned by the fearful community who refuses to sell their goods to Mak and runs away. A drunk villager attempts to shout out a warning to Mak but is forced down and hushed by her son. Mak's four friends then discuss what they had heard, but dismiss the rumors as ridiculous.

Shin, however, while he was sent to fetch Mak, saw that the house was a dilapidated wreck that hadn't been maintained for months as one of the stairs broke, that the baby cot that Mak and Nak's son, Dang, was supposed to be sleeping in, was rocking by itself, and then he saw Nak extending her arm to an unnatural length to retrieve a dropped lime under the house.

The following day, Ter accuses Shin of being delusional, however, while taking a dump in the forest, Ter discovers a decomposed corpse behind the house wearing exactly the same ring as Nak. The drunk villager who had also tried to warn them earlier also turned up mysteriously drowned.

Mak invites his four friends up to eat supper, in which they are given leaves and worm made by Nak. They later play charades. One of them involve a wordplay "Phi Sua" lit: "Butterfly", that requires Nak to be described as a ghost "Phi." Mak then dismisses all of their warnings, proclaims that they are no longer his friends, and kicks them out of their accommodations.

Later, Mak and Nak go out on a date in the town, visiting an amusement park. Mak's friends attempt to convince Mak that Nak is a ghost at the ferris wheel, but they and the waiting queue were chased away by Nak. They attempt the second time by capturing Mak while they were in the haunted house. This time, they were successful and capture Mak into the forest.

Suddenly, in the forest, Mak's old wartime wound reopens. His friends express surprise at how slowly it has healed, but Shin and Ter become convinced that he, not Nak, is the ghost, and their fears are seemingly confirmed when Mak reacts in pain when they attack him with holy rice. The friends then flee from their wounded friend and rescue Nak since Phueak desires Nak's beauty.

While escaping in a boat, Mak 'returns' to them, walking into the river to them, but ends up almost drowning when he suffers cramps. As ghosts are not supposed to feel cramps, Mak is revealed to not have been a ghost, and he is rescued. When asked why he screamed when hit by the holy rice, he reveals that the rice had riddled his wound, making him yell out in pain. In the following confusion in which they don't know if either Mak or Nak are ghosts or not, Aey drops a ring identical to the one Mak, Nak, and the body behind the house had been wearing. Aey is immediately pronounced a ghost and kicked off the boat. The others then try to escape, but, as they had lost the paddles to the boat earlier, they cannot move. Nak then somehow produces a soaking wet paddle and hands it to Ter, who suddenly recalls that all of them had been thrown overboard, and had already drifted too far away for a normal person to recover. Ter then stands up on the boat to look between his legs at the group; Nak is revealed to have been the ghost all along as she has extended her arm to place on Mak's shoulder. The four remaining men, including Mak, retreat to a temple. Mak at first doesn't want to leave Nak alone but his friends knock Mak unconscious, the carry him to the temple.

There, the men come under the protection of the local monk, armed with holy rice, holy water, and the temple is fortified with an enchanted 'safety ring.' Nak quickly appears, in her terrifying ghostly form, and attacks. Initially, the holy 'weapons' successfully keep Nak at bay, but, in a panic, coupled with Mak's struggle to get back to his wife, all of the holy rice and water are wasted, and the monk was accidentally kicked out of the "safety ring." The monk then fled the temple, leaving the four, who had since destroyed the 'safety ring' while trying to run, to face the angry Nak. A pale Aey then reappears, and it was revealed that he is also human; he was in possession of the ring because he had stolen it off of the corpse behind the house to finance his gambling. With that topic settled, they finally remember that they were supposed to flee from Nak. Nak angrily shouted at the five that she just wanted to be with her loved one, which the four friends argued against since they didn't believe the living can be with the dead, and accuse her of killing the drunk; Nak furiously denies her involvement and says that the drunk had drowned herself. Nak, in a combination of sadness, anger, and desperation, then threatens to kill Mak and take him to live with her, but stops when she sees how much she had been scaring her husband. Mak then revealed he knew the truth about Nak all along, having had his suspicions raised during the game of charades. He had already looked at Nak between his legs, which revealed her ghostly form, and found her decomposed corpse. However, even then, he is far more afraid of living without her than of her being dead. The two tearfully reconcile. His friends, seeing them reuniting, also tearfully reaffirm their friendship, and vow to never leave each other again, even if one of them dies. A flashback to Mak and Nak's first meeting is shown.

In the credit scenes, Mak, his wife and now his four friends live happily in the village. Nak uses her supernatural abilities to do chores, play charades (and helping Mak win for the first time), scare off villagers attempting to drive her away (who are led by the village drunk's son) and even run the town's 'haunted house' attraction. It is also revealed that her child, Dang, also possesses some of her abilities, even though he is still an infant.

Cast

Mario Maurer as Mak
Davika Hoorne as Nak
Kantapat Permpoonpatcharasuk as Aey (เอ)
Nuttapong Chartpong as Ter (เต๋อ)
Wiwat Kongrasri as Shin (ชิน)
Pongsathorn Jongwilas as Puak (เผือก)

Reception
Pee Mak earned more than 1 billion baht ($33 million) in revenue worldwide (mostly in Asia), and becoming the highest-grossing Thai film of all time, more than tripling the record held by The Legend of Suriyothai. The film sold a record 16 million tickets worldwide. The film also screened in Indonesia, Hong Kong, Cambodia, Malaysia, Taiwan, Singapore, Myanmar, Brunei and Japan. It is the first Thai film to be screened in every Southeast Asian country. It was also screened at East Wind Film Festival in England.

The film received generally positive critical reviews, with a positive review in The Nation and The Guardian seeing it as a major success for Thai cinema.

Accolades

Remake 
Pee Mak has been adapted to Tamil in Bayama Irukku (2017), and in Malayalam as Kinavalli (2020). Bollywood producer Bhushan Kumar brought rights for hindi version with star Sidharth Malhotra & Shraddha Kapoor.

See also
 List of ghost films
 Bayama Irukku
 Kinavalli

References

External links
 
 Pee Mak Movie at sanook! 
 Pee Mak the movie at Movie MThai 

Films directed by Banjong Pisanthanakun
2013 films
GMM Tai Hub films
Thai comedy horror films
Thai romantic comedy films
2013 romantic comedy films
Thai ghost films
Thai films remade in other languages
2013 comedy horror films
Films set in the 1850s
Films based on Mae Nak Phra Khanong
Thai national heritage films